Pedro Maurice Swann (born October 27, 1970) is a retired American outfielder who spent parts of three seasons in Major League Baseball (MLB) with the Atlanta Braves (2000), Toronto Blue Jays (2002) and Baltimore Orioles (2003). Swann spent 16 seasons in the minor leagues and played only 25 games in the majors, making his major league debut at the age of 29.  Currently, Swann is the bench coach for the Camden Riversharks team of the Atlantic League of Professional Baseball.

Playing career
Swann was drafted out of Delaware State University in the 26th round of the 1991 Major League Baseball draft by the Atlanta Braves. He spent 13 seasons in the minors before making his debut for the Braves in 2000, striking out in both of his at-bats that season. On February 14, Swann signed with the Toronto Blue Jays and spent most of the season in Triple-A, but did play 13 games for the Blue Jays.

For 2003, he signed with the Baltimore Orioles and again spent a few games in the majors. His most notable performance as a major leaguer occurred at Camden Yards on September 18, 2003. An attempt to avoid Hurricane Isabel by changing the game's start time from 7:05 pm (ET) to 12:35 pm proved futile as the contest was played entirely in a downpour. With the score tied at one, Swann opened the bottom of the fifth inning with a double off Mike Mussina. When Brian Roberts hit a one-out single to left field, Orioles third-base coach Tom Trebelhorn had initially waved Swann home. He abruptly put up the stop sign when left fielder Hideki Matsui quickly threw the ball to third baseman Aaron Boone. Swann, who was too far past third base, got caught in a rundown and was tagged out. When the inning ended with the Orioles failing to score a run, the match was suspended and replayed in its entirety eight days later on September 26 as part of a twi-night doubleheader at Yankee Stadium. The Orioles would have had a 2–1 victory had Swann successfully crossed home plate because the game became official upon the completion of the fifth inning.

He became a free agent after the  season and signed a minor league contract with the Cincinnati Reds for the  season. In 127 games for Triple-A Louisville, he hit .285 with 18 home runs and 85 Runs batted in. In , he played in Double-A and Triple-A for the Philadelphia Phillies, with the Tabasco Olmecs in the Mexican League, and Camden Riversharks of the independent Atlantic League. In , he again played for the Double-A and Triple-A teams and announced his retirement before the start of the  season.

Coaching career
Pedro Swann operates Pro Swing Sports Academy, an indoor training facility in Middletown, Delaware. Also on the staff are two other former major leaguers, pitcher Dwayne Henry and Carlos Mendez, a former first baseman and catcher. Swann offers hitting lessons, while Dwayne gives pitching and Carlos catching instruction.

Prior to the 2013 season, Swann was hired as the head baseball coach of the Maryland-Eastern Shore Hawks. He left after the 2014 season to become the bench coach for the Camden Riversharks.

Head coaching records
Below is a table of Swann's yearly records as an NCAA head baseball coach.

Film career
Swann played the role of Juan Vasquez in the 1999 film "For the Love of the Game" starring Kevin Costner.

See also
 List of current NCAA Division I baseball coaches

References

External links

Retrosheet
Pro Swing Sports Academy (official website)

1970 births
Living people
African-American baseball coaches
African-American baseball players
Águilas del Zulia players
American expatriate baseball players in Canada
American expatriate baseball players in Mexico
Atlanta Braves players
Baltimore Orioles players
Baseball coaches from Delaware
Baseball players from Wilmington, Delaware
Camden Riversharks players
Caribes de Anzoátegui players
Delaware State Hornets baseball players
Delaware State University alumni
Durham Bulls players
Greenville Braves players
Idaho Falls Braves players
Leones del Caracas players
American expatriate baseball players in Venezuela
Louisville Bats players
Major League Baseball outfielders
Major League Baseball replacement players
Maryland Eastern Shore Hawks baseball coaches
Mexican League baseball right fielders
Olmecas de Tabasco players
Ottawa Lynx players
Pastora de los Llanos players
Pulaski Braves players
Reading Phillies players
Richmond Braves players
Scranton/Wilkes-Barre Red Barons players
Syracuse SkyChiefs players
Tiburones de La Guaira players
Toledo Mud Hens players
Toronto Blue Jays players
American expatriate baseball players in Australia
21st-century African-American sportspeople
20th-century African-American sportspeople